Mount Nebo is a mountain in the present-day Western Jordan on which, according to the Bible, the prophet Moses died.

Mount Nebo may also refer to:

Australia
 Mount Nebo (Queensland), a rural locality, and part of the D'Aguilar Range, Queensland
 Mount Nebo (New South Wales), a hill near Wollongong and part of the foothills of Mount Keira

Ireland
 Raheencullen or Mount Nebo, an estate of John Hunter Gowan II near Craanford in north County Wexford

Philippines
Mount Nebo, Bukidnon, a barangay of Valencia City, Bukidnon

United States
 Mount Nebo (Arkansas), south of the Arkansas River in central Arkansas, home of Mount Nebo State Park
 Mount Nebo (Poolesville, Maryland)
 Mount Nebo (Minnesota), a large hill in Todd County, central Minnesota
 Mount Nebo (New York), a mountain in the Catskills
 Mount Nebo Archaeological District, a group of archaeological sites in Ohio
 Mount Nebo (Oregon), at the boundary of the Eagle Cap Wilderness
 Mount Nebo, Allegheny County, Pennsylvania
 Mount Nebo, Lancaster County, Pennsylvania, a place in Pennsylvania
 Mount Nebo, Westmoreland County, Pennsylvania, a place in Pennsylvania
 Mount Nebo (Utah), the highest point in the Wasatch Range of Utah
 Mount Nebo, Nicholas County, West Virginia

Other uses 

 Mount Nebo Cemetery, Carlton, Clarke County, Alabama

See also
Naboo, fictional place in Star Wars